The Night Comes Illuminated With Death is the debut full-length studio album of Cloak of Altering, released on June 27, 2011 by Human Jigsaw Records.

Track listing

Personnel
Adapted from The Night Comes Illuminated With Death liner notes.
 Maurice de Jong (as Mories) –  vocals, instruments, recording, cover art

Release history

References

External links 
 The Night Comes Illuminated With Death at Discogs (list of releases)
 The Night Comes Illuminated With Death at Bandcamp

2011 debut albums
Cloak of Altering albums